Hürtgenwald is a municipality in the district of Düren in the federal state of North Rhine-Westphalia, Germany. It is located in the Eifel hills, approx. 15 km south-west of Düren. Much of the area is covered by forest (Hürtgenwald in literal translation means Hürtgen Forest).

Hürtgenwald is composed of the villages Bergstein, Brandenberg, Gey, Großhau, Horm, Hürtgen, Kleinhau, Raffelsbrand, Schafberg, Simonskall, Strass, Vossenack and Zerkall (in alphabetical order). Kleinhau with the town hall is not only the administrational center of the community, but has  become the commercial center as well (shops and a few supermarkets).

In World War II, Hürtgenwald was the theater of what is considered one of the a major battle. Two large war graves (one in Hürtgen, one in Vossenack) are places to commemorate those who fell.

Nowadays, the pleasing landscape of forested hills, lakes and rivers attracts a lot of people from nearby densely populated areas, e.g. from the Cologne area and the Ruhr Area, for recreational reasons.

See also

 Battle of Hürtgen Forest
 1944 Hürtgen Forest Museum

References

Düren (district)